Mehregan (also Romanized as Mehregān and Mehrgān) is a village in Maskun Rural District, Jebalbarez District, Jiroft County, Kerman Province, Iran. At the 2006 census, its population was 36, in 10 families.

References 

Populated places in Jiroft County